The 1991 South American Cross Country Championships took place on February 2, 1991.  The races were held in Ambato, Ecuador.  Competitions open for youth athletes (under 17) were held for the first time.

Medal winners, and medal winners for junior and youth competitions were published.

Medallists
All results are marked "affected by altitude" (A), because Ambato is situated at an elevation of about 2,600 m above sea level.

Medal table (unofficial)

Participation
Athletes from at least 2 countries participated.

 (5)
 ( at least 16)

See also
 1991 in athletics (track and field)

References

External links
 GBRathletics

South American Cross Country Championships
South American Cross Country Championships
South American Cross Country Championships
International athletics competitions hosted by Ecuador
Cross country running in Ecuador
February 1991 sports events in South America